My Wild Irish Rose is a lost 1922 American silent drama film directed by David Smith and based on Dion Boucicault's 19th century play The Shaughraun. It was produced and released by the Vitagraph Company of America.

Plot 
Based on the play The Shaughraun, this is the story of Robert Ffolliat, a young Irish lad, who is done out of his land and sent off to a penal colony in Australia following false accusations by the greedy Kinchella. Conn the Shaughraun comes to his rescue, helps him to escape from the prison ship and return to Ireland where he is united with his sweetheart.

Cast 
 Pat O'Malley as Conn, The Shaughraun
 Helen Howard as Arte O'Neale
 Maude Emory as Claire Ffolliott (credited as Maud Emery)
 Pauline Starke as Moya
 Edward Cecil as Robert Folliott
 Henry Herbert as Capt. Molineaux (credited as Henry Hebert)
 Jim Farley as Corry Cinchella (credited as James Farley)
 Bobbie Mack as Harvey Duff (credited as Bobby Mack)
 Frank Clark as Father Dolan
 Richard Daniels as Barry
 Mickey Daniels as Moya's little brother (uncredited)

References

External links 

 
 
 Lantern glass slide (archived)

1922 films
American silent feature films
Lost American films
American black-and-white films
Films directed by David Smith (director)
Vitagraph Studios films
Silent American drama films
1922 drama films
1922 lost films
Lost drama films
1920s American films